Nedre may refer to:

Nedre Eggedal, village in Sigdal municipality, Norway
Nedre Eiker, municipality in Buskerud county, Norway
Nedre Elvehavn, borough of Trondheim, Norway
Nedre Fagervollvatnet, Norwegian lake that lies in Rana municipality in Nordland
Nedre Fiplingvatnet, Norwegian lake that lies in Grane municipality in Nordland
Nedre Heimdalsvatnet, lake which lies in Vågå and Øystre Slidre municipalities in Oppland county, Norway
Nedre Roasten, lake in Femundsmarka National Park in Sør-Trøndelag county, Norway
Nedre Stjørdal, former municipality in Nord-Trøndelag county, Norway
Nedre Veikvatnet, Norwegian lake that lies in Sørfold municipality in Nordland